Glen Flora is an unincorporated community in Wharton County, Texas, United States. It is located on Farm to Market Road 102 (FM 102) at its intersection with Farm to Market Road 960 (FM 960). For most of the 20th century, the town was situated along a railroad line, but the tracks have since been removed. There are several businesses in the community.

Geography

Glen Flora has a post office with the zip code of 77443. Public education is provided by both Wharton Independent School District which services the north side of FM 102 and El Campo Independent School District which services the south side of the highway.

Demographics
According to the Handbook of Texas, the community had an estimated population of 210 in 2000.

Gallery

References

External links

Unincorporated communities in Texas
Unincorporated communities in Wharton County, Texas